Fort Apocalypse is video game for the Atari 8-bit family created by Steve Hales and published by Synapse Software in 1982. Joe Vierra ported it to the Commodore 64 the same year. Fort Apocalypse is a multi-directional scrolling shooter where the player navigates an underground prison in a helicopter, destroying or avoiding enemies and rescuing the prisoners. A contemporary of Choplifter, it has similarities to that game as well as the arcade games Scramble and Super Cobra.

Gameplay 
Fort Apocalypse is played within a multi-directional scrolling "cave", viewed from the side. Similar to Choplifter, and as opposed to Scramble, the map does not automatically scroll, and the player is free to move in any direction.

The map is divided into four vertical sections, with the uppermost being at ground level, and the lowest containing the titular fortress. The two middle layers, Draconis and the Crystalline Caves, both contain a landing pad that saves the game's progress and allows the player to re-animate at that point if they are destroyed. Eight hostages can be picked up on both of these middle layers. The map is further divided into sections by special walls that can be broken open by firing or dropping bombs on them.

The player's chopper is destroyed if it runs into the cavern walls, is shot down by the numerous enemies, or caught in one of the many laser or moving wall traps. The player has two weapons, a gun and bombs, but only one button on the joystick. Most of the time the button fires the gun, but when the helicopter has turned so it's facing out of the screen, then the button drops bombs. Enemy missiles track the player's movements for a short time before running out of fuel and dropping back to earth, and the map is populated by a number of enemy helicopters similar to the player's own.

Development
Most of the basic concepts of Synapse's games were developed by the company's president, Ihor Wolosenko. Fort Apocalypse was one of the few that was not, and traces its origin to a dream Steve Hales had about helicopters. With Wolosenko's blessing, he began working on the project in 1982. He took part of his inspiration from the movie Blue Thunder.

While the programming was getting started, another programmer decided to leave the company in the midst of completing one of Wolosenko's projects, Slime. Hales was pulled off the development of Fort Apocalypse to finish Slime, but found the code too difficult to continue and had to start over from scratch. The resulting delay meant Broderbund's Choplifter reached the market first, and Fort Apocalypse was often considered a me-too effort. When Hales saw Choplifter, his reaction was: "Why did I stop working on Fort?"

The game was publicly demonstrated at the Consumer Electronics Show and the players complained that it was too hard. This led to changes in the map and a few other tweaks.

Reception
The game was a relative success, ultimately selling about 75,000 copies on the Atari, and more than that on the Commodore.

Softline praised Fort Apocalypses "game complexity and difficulty of play—just enough to keep you coming back and progressing a little further each time". Antic was also pleased with the effort: "The game is fun to play and has lots of action and good sound effects" but criticized the sound of the helicopter itself, comparing it to the sound of "someone walking in wet shoes". Also noting the game's difficulty, The Commodore 64 Home Companion called the graphics and sound "impressive". Electronic Fun disliked it, giving the game only 1.5 joysticks out of 5. It is also one of the most direct at calling it a mix of other designs; the review starts off with this complaint:

It goes on to complain that anyone playing it would have to be "deeply masochistic", especially after you "blow up after running into something you can't even see".

Legacy
In 2007 the game was relicensed to a CC BY-NC-ND 2.5 Creative Commons license and released on IgorLabs, a site founded by Steve Hales and other game developers.

On April 23, 2015, Steve Hales released the assembler source code to Fort Apocalypse on GitHub, also under CC BY-NC-ND 2.5, for historical reasons. A Twitter account for the release claimed "if enough people followed a version for iOS and Android would be made".

Notes

References

External links
 Fort Apocalypse, C64-wiki page (in German)
 GitHub source code release
 IgorLabs classic games page, with all the games Steve Hales wrote for the Atari 8-bit computers

1982 video games
Atari 8-bit family games
Cancelled ZX Spectrum games
Commodore 64 games
Helicopter video games
Synapse Software games
Commercial video games with freely available source code
Creative Commons-licensed video games
Video games developed in the United States